is a Japanese multimedia series by ASCII Media Works. The project was unveiled in April 2012 in Dengeki Girl's Style. It spawned into Light novel, otome game adaptation developed by Kadokawa Games and Vridge for the PlayStation Vita. An anime television series adaptation developed by Madhouse entitled  aired on January 5, 2016, to March 22, 2016. And a spin-off manga entitled Prince of Stride Galaxy Rush launched in November 2015 in Dengeki Maoh. The series is based around the fictional extreme sport of "stride", which is akin to the real-life extreme sport of parkour. Which revolves a team of six to run a relay race through a town.

Plot
The series revolves around the extreme sport "Stride", a sport where a team of 5 plus a relationer runs relay races in towns. Nana Sakurai, a first-year Hōnan Academy high school student decided join Stride club after she watch Best Stride Ever video two years ago alongside her classmate, Takeru Fujiwara and Riku Yagami. Upon learning the Hōnan Stride club has been inactive for two years following a violent incident. They decided try to re-establish the school's "Stride" team by recruiting 6 members. Both Takeru and Riku asked Nana to become a relationer as well as a manager. Their goal is to join other schools to compete and win Eastern Japan's top Stride competition, the "End of Summer" as well develop friendship with Saisei academy stride club who also an idol group called "Galaxy Standard".

Characters

Hōnan (方南)
Prior to the series, Hōnan's Stride club used to be a popular club until an accident when its popularity decreases. Making it so small that all members automatically enter into the Shogi club (which only has Ayumu) as well since each club must have at least three members. In visual novel (with the exception of Ayumu and Yujiro) all Hōnan's Stride club members serves as Nana's love interest.

Nana is the player character in the visual novel and the protagonist in the anime. She is a hardworking girl who has moved alone from Hokkaido to Tokyo, and has transferred to Hōnan Academy due to her admiration of the old Stride team. Soon after joining, she was given the position of the relationer of the Stride club by Fujiwara as well as her role as a manager. Since her father is known as the "King of Stride", Nana is unofficially known as the "Princess of Stride". In visual novel, Nana is not voiced in game. Instead, she only speaking as the narrator and the relationer.

Riku is another freshman who becomes friends with Nana on their first meeting. He is cheerful and friendly, also has good motor skills. He loves all kinds of sports except Kabbadi, and wishes to join all of the sports club in the school. His family runs a bakery shop. In the past, he and his older brother Tomoe used to be running together since kids. However, after seeing his running skill is much better than him. Riku becoming overshadowed by this, and he choose not to involving stride until meet Nana and decided running again in order showing his stride to Tomoe. In Visual Novel, he serves as one of Nana's love interest.

Always cool and stoic. His only interest is stride. In middle school, he was a famous stride runner. He usually wears glasses with no frames on top, but during practice he uses contacts. He seems to have strong faith in Riku's athletic ability as Riku finished in a dead-heat in the 2-on-2 race against Heath. He tends to feel people's legs to determine their talent, but resulting creeping peoples. It is later revealed that he can't both swim and singing. Takeru has conflicts with his father due the pursuing his dream rather follow his expectations. He finally able convince him thanks to Nana. In Visual Novel, he serves as one of Nana's love interest.

Looks cute, loves collecting small animal plushies, but actually loves terrible jokes and wants to work in the theater. Even if he's injured, he always carries a smile. The caring eldest son of a big family. He especially cares for Ayumu. His technique is such that he relies more on acrobatic parkour skills rather than running speed to overtake others, thus being touted as "The Trickster of Hōnan". A running gag in series is Heath older sister often forcing him to cross-dress model due to his feminine appearances. It is shown he is from broken family and has tried best taking care his younger siblings. He has grudge toward his father since he left him and his mother. However, he finally learn the truth: the reason he left them was because their business is going bankrupt and he didn't want them involved. Just as Hozumi decided meet him, he was shocked to find out that his father is now death. This resulting him completely crying and thanking Nana for helping him. In Visual Novel, he serves as one of Nana's love interest.

Leader of the Stride club. Full of manly spirit, he has a dependable aura. He's half British and has two sisters; one is president of a company, the other is a model. Heath himself also models sometimes against his will. In the past, Heath, Kyosuke, and Tomoe were part of "Honan's Golden Trio" until an incident two years ago, which resulted in its disbandment. It is also revealed he is the weakest of the trio. He didn't feel practice was necessary since the club doesn't have enough members to even race, and thus was de-registered by the Japanese Stride Association (JSA). He later regains hope when Nana, Riku, and Takeru join the Stride club. He manages to convince Kuga to come back, as well and thanking Nana for regain his hope. In Visual Novel, he serves as one of Nana's love interest.

A former member of Hōnan's stride club. He's considered as a somewhat scary person because an incident where he took the blame for and quit stride club. Kuga has a mysterious vibe to him and may often appear as a loner. Despite this, he actually very kind person. He's finally convinced to rejoin the Stride club by Heath. With the help Kaede and his father, he was able clear his name and thanks Nana for this. It seems he enjoy buying foods or drinks for Nana since he thinks it will makes her smile. In Visual Novel, he serves as one of Nana's love interest.

He is a passionate Shogi player first, self-proclaimed "King" and leader of the Shogi club (the only true member), reluctant runner second. He has green hair and wears glasses. He was a Relationer last year, and relayed information to Heath and Hozumi in the 2-on-2 race. He then contemplated quitting the team and the Shogi club because he has no talent as a runner before Kyosuke took his place. Ayumu has been friend with Hozumi since first-year and it seems he is aware about his current situasions, like Ayumu knew Hozumi's simle is fake and his heart is never happy. He entrused Nana for taking care Hozumi since he knew she can make Hozumi truly smile again.

 

The coach and advisor of the Stride team. He often speaks using four-character idiomatic phrases. Somehow, he never uses the same ones. In the past, he used to be Joe's junior in high school and he sees Nana can bring Hōnan's Stride club regain its glory.

Saisei
Team name: Galaxy Standard, which is also an idol band, and is the first rival of Honan, having been matched up on their debut match.

The captain of Saisei Stride Club. A competitive person, and his competitiveness triggered an after match with Takeru. Despite being competitive, he is very friendly toward his rivals. He came from famous Kabuki dancer family, which is very rich and they want Reiji to quit both his Idol and Stride activity in order to continue family traditions. Inside his cheerful and relaxed personality, he is shown very stressful because he must taking all responsibilities for his stride team, idol activity, and his family's heavy inheritance burden. This is resulting him collapses several times. This would change upon meeting Nana first time after finding her phone, which he took interest on her since they have same phone charm and he nicknamed Nana is "Dosanko-chan" (a nickname for someone born and raised in Hokkaido). In Visual Novel, he serves as one of Nana's love interest and is only from Saisei.
 

The relationer of Saisei Stride Club and faithful aide of Suwa Reiji. Dubbed as "superhuman" because he can do everything (maybe except cooking) by his younger brother, Mayuzumi Azuma. He can give accurate command to his runners. In the past, he was used to be runners until certain incident which resulting him in bound-wheelchair. But after he gone through several Psiotherapy. He was able walk again.
 

Likes to be referred to as "Ban-chan". He is also known as the "Trickster" of Saisei, is lively, and full of enthusiasm. he becoming good friends with Ayumu and Hozumi since they loves making silly jokes.

He is very serious and will do almost anything to help Mr. Reiji win. He will often shove the other Stride team to the side, like he did with Heath.

Younger brother of Mayuzumi Shizuma. Called the most plain in the group because of minimal stage presence and is made fun of because of that by his teammates. He becoming close friend with Riku since they had older brothers, he jokes they both have "superhuman" as older brothers.

Huge fan of Kuga Kyosuke. He tries his best to beat Kuga, and often shows off while running in a Stride race. His father revealed to be politician.

Mihashi

The captain of Mihashi Stride Club. He also is the secret true Relationer of the team. He wants to win since it was his brother, Kamoda Yu,'s last summer.

The Relationer of Mihashi Stride Club in name only. He mainly bluffs and calls out false sets.

Ichijyōkan

A third-year runner who looks like a girl and has the best parkour skills on his team. He's sworn Hozumi as his enemy.

The third-year Relationer who is very sadistic and tries to use past traumas against their opponents. He thinks the Relationer is supreme, and that the others can't run without him.

A third-year runner who was pitted against Kuga. He's been naturally blessed with an excellent body, a simple mind, and has never felt any stress or troubles.

A third-year runner who was the anchor for Ichijikan. He was badly outmatched by Takeru. He's one of Himemiya Yuri's henchmen.

A third-year runner who's popular with the girls. He's one of Himemiya Yuri's three henchmen.

A third-year runner who is very talkative, annoying, and noisy. He fell in love with Yuri without knowing he was a guy. He's one of Yuri's three henchmen.

Kakyôin

Yagami Riku's older brother. A former member of the Hōnan Stride team who left in his third year of high school to study abroad in America. He returns to invite Kuga to join his school.

The new coach of the Kakyôin Stride team and Nana's father. He is known as the "King" for making the sport popular in Japan. He was working in America at the start of the series before coming back just before the End of Summer tournament.

Other

Heath's elder sister and the president of a fashion company. In exchange for sponsoring the Honan Stride Club, she has the team members model her company's clothes. Initially, the deal was that they win Kichijoji Spring Festival. After suffering through the bragging of a rival company (who was sponsoring the Saisei Stride Team), Diane continued to sponsor Honan and created new jerseys for the team to wear for official matches.

Media

Light novel
A light novel adaptation has been published by Kadokawa company, best known for publishing Bang Dream! print media. It was known as "Visual Novel" (a light novel with many illustration). It was published on November 22, 2012, and ended on August 21, 2017.

Video game
The otome game was announced during Dengeki game festival 2014. The game was initially released on July 9, 2015, but was later delayed to July 30, 2015. It will released exclusive for PlayStation Vita platform. The limited version will included a drama CD and a booklet.

While the game storyline following Novel's storylines. The game has added Romance element stories, which all Hōnan's runner (except Ayumu) serves as Nana's love interest. In addition to Hōnan, Reiji Suwa from Saisei also serves as Nana's love interest and is only from another school.

Anime
The anime's opening theme song is "Strider's High" by OxT (Masayoshi Ōishi x Tom-H@ck). The anime's ending theme is "Be My Steady" by Galaxy Standard, a music unit composed of the voice actors from the anime's Saisei Academy Stride Club (Mamoru Miyano, Daisuke Hirakawa, Takuya Eguchi, Tatsuhisa Suzuki, Yuuki Ono, and Toshiyuki Toyonaga). Funimation has licensed the anime to stream the anime in both subtitled and dubbed versions.

As the name implied, the anime adaptation will have different storyline instead adapted from novel (due the novel still published until ended in 2017). The anime serves Riku as protagonist and will follow his story join stride club to defeat his brother.

Episode list
All episode are numbered by Step followed by the title of the episode.

Stage play
On Dengeki Spring festivals 2016, it was announced Prince of Stride would receive a five-episode stage play adaptation called Prince of Stride THE LIVE STAGE. The plays will feature actors trained in parkour, and they will run on stage and throughout the seating area while a wind effect blows through the audience.

The four-episode will adapted based novel story while episode 5 is original story taking one year after end of summer 2017.

The episode 5 story depicted a mysterious man named Isamu Isurugi who also Joe's rivals in the past created a team Stride for participated in America. He recruit several students from different schools both current and graduated stride members including Yuri, Reiji, and Takeru. This is creating conflicted Takeru to choose pursuing his dream or stay with Riku and Nana. Reiji, Shizuma, Yuri, Toya, and Tomoe learning about this decided asking Joe to creating his own team and challenge Isamu team to compete a stride battle including Nana and Riku to join his stride team and fixing their strained friendship.

Notes

References

External links
Prince of Stride official website 
Prince of Stride: Alternative official website 

The Visual Novel Database

2015 manga
2015 video games
Prince of Stride Alternative
Prince of Stride Alternative
Crunchyroll anime
Dengeki Comics
Kadokawa Dwango franchises
Extreme sports video games
Madhouse (company)
Otome games
PlayStation Vita games
PlayStation Vita-only games
Seinen manga
Video games developed in Japan
Fictional sports in anime and manga
Video games set in Tokyo